Maksim Yuryevich Aristarkhov (born 9 March 1980) is a former Russian professional footballer.

Club career
He made his debut in the Russian Premier League in 2000 for FC Torpedo Moscow.

Honours
 Russian Premier League bronze: 2000.

References

External links

1980 births
Living people
Sportspeople from Kaluga
Russian footballers
Russian expatriate footballers
Expatriate footballers in Ukraine
Russian expatriate sportspeople in Ukraine
FC Torpedo Moscow players
FC Torpedo-2 players
FC Tom Tomsk players
FC Arsenal Kyiv players
FC Amkar Perm players
FC Anzhi Makhachkala players
FC Metalurh Zaporizhzhia players
FC Akhmat Grozny players
FC Zorya Luhansk players
FC Metallurg Lipetsk players
FC Volga Nizhny Novgorod players
Russian Premier League players
Ukrainian Premier League players
Association football forwards
FC Nosta Novotroitsk players